Langenheim is a surname. People with this surname include:

 Ruby Rose Langenheim, actress
 Frederick Langenheim, co-creator of Stereopticon